A snow patch is a geomorphological pattern of snow and firn accumulation which lies on the surface for a longer time than other seasonal snow cover. There are two types to distinguish; seasonal snow patches and perennial snow patches. Seasonal patches usually melt during the late summer but later than the rest of the snow. Perennial snow patches are stable for more than two years and also have a bigger influence on surroundings. 

Snow patches often start in sheltered places where both thermal and orographical conditions are favourable for the conservation of snow such as small existing depressions, gullies or other concave patterns. The main process that creates these accumulations is called nivation. It is a complex of processes that includes freeze–thaw action (weathering by the alternate freezing and melting of ice), mass movement (the downhill movement of substances under gravity), and erosion by meltwater which is the main agent of the surroundings' influence. 

There is high soil moisture around the snow patch that supports growing of specific vegetation. Snow patch vegetation is very distinctive. It is usually dominated by species that tolerate a shortened growing season and is predominantly herbaceous. With increasing duration of snow persistence, non – vascular plants predominated over vascular plants for example Salicetum herbaceae, Salix herbacea etc.

At times water can be seen flowing downslope from the margin of snowpatches. The origin of this water may be from the melting of the snowpatch itself, from groundwater reaching the surface in slopes next to the snowpatch or from groundwater being forced to surface by obstructing permafrost. In areas with permafrost the active layer may be lacking under snowpatches, with the permaforst extending all the way to the firn at the base of the snowpatch.

References

Snow
Glaciology